Rigid constitution is a constitution which stands above the other laws of the country, while flexible constitutions do not.

A. V. Dicey defines a rigid constitution as one under which certain laws, called constitutional laws or fundamental laws "cannot be changed in the same manner as ordinary laws." A rigid constitution  set forth "specific legal/constitutional obstacles to be overcome" before it may be amended, such as special approval of the people by referendum, a supermajority or special majority in the legislature, or both. In contrast, a flexible constitution is one in which the legislature may amend the constitution's content and principles through use of the ordinary legislative process.

See also

References

Constitutional law